The Wulwulam, also known as the Woolwonga, were an indigenous Australian people of the Northern Territory. They are reputed to have been almost completely exterminated in the 1880s in reprisal for an incident in which some members of the tribe speared 4 miners.

Country
On their eastern flank, their boundary lay at the source of the South Alligator River. They were also reported in the Mount Bundy area.

People
According to Norman Tindale, the Norwegian ethnographer Knut Dahl was referring to the Wulwulam in those passages where he wrote of the Agigondin, a central tableland tribe and a horde called the Agoguila.

History of contact
The Wulwulam's numbers grew as a result of the rapid reduction of members of two tribes to their south and west as European colonization developed, namely the Agikwala, Awinmul and Awarai. Remnants of the two were absorbed into the Wulwulam as subtribal hordes.

History
Copper mining discovered near Mt. Haywood in 1882 led to the development of a settlement on tribal lands along the Daly River soon afterwards, and members of the Wulwulam tribe were drawn to the site and employed there. Starting on 3 September 1884, several Wulwulam murdered four European settlers and in a reprisal known as the Coppermine massacres. Francis Herbert Sachse who ran a cattle station and also managed the mine, led the massacre at Blackfellow Creek, where an estimated 150 natives were shot, leading to their effective extermination. The Norwegian ethnographer Knut Dahl, who lived in the area for over a year a decade later, wrote as follows:
The sequel, which in the Australian bush has always followed such murders, occurred in due course... Another gathering of white men, friends and fellows of the victims, also embarked upon a campaign of vengeance against the Wolwanga tribe, which had been responsible for the deed. The reports on this campaign
vary, but participants have told me that after a long search they finally found a great portion of the tribe gathered at the abandoned mine. They surrounded them, drove them into a lagoon, and shot them all, men, women and children.

The pogrom continued for some years, enfeebling what had been the most powerful Daly river tribe, and also decimating the Mulluk-Mulluk tribe.

Four Wulwulam men, Tommy, Jimmy, Daly, and Ajibbingwagne, were put on trial for the killings of 4 settlers, Johannes Lubrecht Noltenius, Jack Landers (known as Hellfire Jack), Henry Houschildt and Schollert. The Jesuit mission diary records Sachse as still waging his campaign against the Wulwulam 4 years later, in 1888.

Charlie Yingi, known as Long Legged Charlie, one of the four Aboriginal men charged for the killings, was cleared eventually and settled at the Jesuit Mission on the Daly River. He was later sentenced to death for the Coppermine killing.

In 2014 there came to light a document indicating that one child of Wulwulam/Woolwonga parentage had been registered in the census undertaken in 1889, and that by virtue of this fact, her descendants moved to assert native title rights to the old Wulwulam hunting grounds.

Alternative names
 Agigondin (eastern horde)
 Agikwala, Agiqwolla, Agoguila, Aquguila
 Agiwallem
 Agrikondi, Aggraakúndi
 Oolwunga Oolawunga
 Wolwongga, Wulwanga, Wolwanga, Wulwonga, Woolwonga

Source:

Notes

Citations

Sources

Aboriginal peoples of the Northern Territory